Vine Hill is a historic plantation house located near Centerville, Franklin County, North Carolina.  It was built / remodeled about 1856–1858, and is a two-story, three bay, four-square Italianate / Greek Revival style frame dwelling.  It is sheathed in weatherboard and has a hipped roof.  It was built / remodeled by noted American carpenter and builder Jacob W. Holt (1811-1880).

It was listed on the National Register of Historic Places in 1975.

References

Plantation houses in North Carolina
Houses on the National Register of Historic Places in North Carolina
Houses completed in 1858
Italianate architecture in North Carolina
Greek Revival houses in North Carolina
Houses in Franklin County, North Carolina
National Register of Historic Places in Franklin County, North Carolina